Mahawoa is a monotypic genus of flowering plants belonging to the family Apocynaceae. The only species is Mahawoa montana.

Its native range is Central Malesia.

References

Apocynaceae
Monotypic Apocynaceae genera